Gair Rhydd (meaning "free word"; stylised as "gair rhydd") is the official student newspaper of Cardiff University. It is a weekly, free, tabloid-sized paper established in 1972. Its sections cover local and international news, comment, politics, science, advice, the Welsh-language section "Taf-od", campus life and sport. 

In 2003, Gair Rhydd launched Quench, a fortnightly student lifestyle magazine. In 2013, Quench transitioned to a monthly format, and is now editorially independent of Gair Rhydd.

History
The first paid editor, Meirion Jones (now on the BBC's Newsnight), was elected in 1980. Since then, Gair Rhydd has won several student media awards, some in the early 1990s and, in the 2000s the title of Best Paper at the NUS/Daily Mirror National Student Journalism Awards 2004, Best Newspaper at the Guardian Student Media Awards 2005, with deputy editor James Anthony also being named overall Student Journalist of the Year, and Quench winning Best Magazine, adding to its award for Student Publication of the Year 2005 at the EMAP Fanzine Awards. At the 2008 Guardian Student Media Awards, Quench was named Magazine of the Year. Gair Rhydd was named runner-up in the Newspaper of the Year category at the following year's awards. Most recently, as part of Cardiff Student Media, it won 'Best Student Media' at the NUS Wales awards in 2013.

The position of Gair Rhydd editor formed part of the role of VP Media & Marketing, one of the seven elected officer positions at Cardiff University Students' Union. The role was removed during the 2014–15 academic year, reverting the role of editor back to a non-sabbatical position, meaning the paper had a student editor for the first time since before Meirion Jones.

Past editor Tom Wellingham and two other student journalists were suspended when, on 4 February 2006, they reproduced a controversial cartoon depicting Mohammed. The issue was withdrawn from publication (98% of copies retrieved) within a day of being released, and the Cardiff University Students' Union issued an apology. Cartoons were reinstated as a regular feature in issue #1081 in 2016.

In 2006, Gair Rhydd celebrated the publication of its 800th issue. Later that year, on 12 June 2006, a one-off Berliner format edition (issue number 818) was published, making Gair Rhydd the first non-national British newspaper to use this format, and the only one not owned by Guardian Newspapers.

In March 2013, Gair Rhydd celebrated its 1000th issue with a special 'three-paper' edition. As well as the regular paper, they produced a commemorative pull-out looking back through the previous 41 years, and reproduced the first ever Gair Rhydd.

References

External links
 gair rhydd

Newspapers published in Wales
Cardiff University
Publications established in 1972
Welsh-language newspapers
Student newspapers published in the United Kingdom
Free newspapers
Weekly newspapers published in the United Kingdom